Swansea City is a Welsh football club based in the city of Swansea, which competes in the Premier League. The club was founded in 1912 as Swansea Town, and competed in the Southern Football League until they were elected to The Football League in 1920, as founders of the Third Division. The club changed its name in 1969, when it adopted the name Swansea City to reflect Swansea's new status as a city. In 2010, after winning a Championship Play-off final, Swansea became the first Welsh team to compete in the Premier League.

Swansea's first Southern Football League match was against Cardiff City and they met their 117th and most recent different league opponent, Milton Keynes Dons, for the first time in the 2005–06 Football League season. The team that Swansea have played most in league competition is Plymouth Argyle, who they first met in the 1919–20 Southern Football League season; the 33 wins from 82 meetings is more than they have achieved against any other club. Bristol Rovers and Brighton & Hove Albion have each drawn 23 league encounters with Swansea, more than any other club. The club has been defeated the most by Southampton who have defeated the Swans 32 times.

Key
The records include the results of matches played in the Southern Football League (from 1912 to 1920), The Football League (from 1920 to 2010) and the Premier League (from 2010 to the present day). Wartime matches are regarded as unofficial and are excluded, as are matches from the abandoned 1939–40 season.
For the sake of simplicity, present-day names are used throughout.
The season given as the "first" denotes the season in which Swansea City first played a league match against that team.
The season given as the "last" denotes the season in which Swansea City last played a league match against that team.
  Teams with this background and symbol in the "Club" column are current divisional rivals of Swansea City.
  Clubs with this background and symbol in the "Club" column are defunct.
P = matches played; W = matches won; D = matches drawn; L = matches lost; Win% = percentage of total matches won.

All-time league record
Statistics correct as of matches played up to 13 January 2016.

a  Results in the Southern League sourced from the Jones, Colin (2012): Swansea Town & City Football Club: The Complete Record. Results in The Football League post-1920 and the Premier League sourced to Statto.

See also
List of Swansea City A.F.C. records and statistics
List of Swansea City A.F.C. seasons

Footnotes

A.  Record against Halifax Town A.F.C. included
B.  Record against Clapton Orient included
C.  Record against The Wednesday included
D.  Record against Stoke included
E.  Wimbledon relocated to Milton Keynes in 2004 and were re-branded as Milton Keynes Dons F.C. In 2008 the club renounced all claims to Wimbledon's history, and regarded themselves as a new club founded in 2004.

References
General
 
 
 
Bibliography

Specific

Swansea City A.F.C.
Swansea City A.F.C.